Sir Richard Mason (c. 1633 – 8 March 1685) was an English Member of Parliament and Courtier.

Career
He held the following offices:

 Clerk of the Green Cloth
 Second Clerk Controller of Charles II's Household  
 One of the Commissioners for executing the office of Master of the Horse, 1679 
 MP for Yarmouth 1673
 MP for Bishop's Castle, Shropshire 1680–1.

He had a seat at King's Clere in Hampshire but resided principally at Sutton in Surrey where he owned the manor of Coulsdon.

Marriage and issue
He married c. 1662, Anna Margaretta Long, daughter of Sir James Long, 2nd Baronet. They had two daughters:

 Dorothy, married Sir William Brownlow, 4th Baronet of Humby
Anna, married 1) (div 1698) Charles Gerard, 2nd Earl of Macclesfield, 2) c. 1700 Colonel Henry Brett.

Sir Richard Mason was one of those present at the death of Charles II. His wife, Lady Anna Mason wrote a detailed account of the King's last illness and subsequent death, in a letter to her mother Lady Dorothy Long at Draycot House in Wiltshire. This letter came to light in 1850 when it was found among papers at Draycot House, and was published soon afterwards by Charles Dickens in his weekly magazine Household Words.

Sir Richard Mason died 8 March 1685 and is buried at the parish church at Sutton. His widow and daughter Dorothy inherited the manor of Coulsdon and in 1688 sold the estate to Sir Edward des Bouverie. Lady Mason died in July 1717.

References 

1630s births
1685 deaths
English knights
English MPs 1679
English MPs 1680–1681
English MPs 1681
Members of Parliament for the Isle of Wight